Wisut Artjanawat (born 10 March 1986) is a Thai professional golfer who currently plays on the Asian Development Tour having previously competed on the Asian Tour

Amateur career
Artjanawat played for Thailand in the 2002 Asian Games, finishing tied for 29th in the individual event and seventh in the team event.

Professional career
After turning professional in 2008, Artjanawat played on the Asian Tour but failed to achieve much success finishing outside the top-70 in each of his three seasons on the tour. Since 2008, Artjanawat has also regularly played on the ASEAN PGA Tour and has had five victories on this tour and finished in the top-10 on the Order of Merit every year from 2008 to 2013 (1st, 4th, 4th, 1st, 6th, 3rd).

In 2014, Artjanawat won his first Official World Golf Ranking points event at the PGM Sime Darby Harvard Championship on the Asian Development Tour, and attributed the win to a healthier lifestyle having taken up cycling.

Professional wins (7)

Asian Development Tour wins (1)

1Co-sanctioned by the Professional Golf of Malaysia Tour

ASEAN PGA Tour wins (5)

PGT Asia wins (1)

1Co-sanctioned by the Taiwan PGA Tour

Team appearances
Amateur
Eisenhower Trophy (representing Thailand): 2002

References

External links

Wisut Artjanawat
Asian Tour golfers
Golfers at the 2002 Asian Games
Wisut Artjanawat
Southeast Asian Games medalists in golf
Wisut Artjanawat
Wisut Artjanawat
Competitors at the 2001 Southeast Asian Games
1986 births
Living people